The flying gurnard (Dactylopterus volitans), also known as the helmet gurnard, is a bottom-dwelling fish of tropical to warm temperate waters on both sides of the Atlantic. On the American side, it is found as far north as Massachusetts (exceptionally as far as Canada) and as far south as Argentina, including the Caribbean and Gulf of Mexico. On the European and African side, it ranges from the English Channel to Angola, including the Mediterranean. This is the only species in the monotypic genus Dactylopterus. Similar and related species from the genus Dactyloptena are found in the Indian and Pacific Oceans.

This fish is variable in coloration, being brownish or greenish with reddish or yellowish patches. When excited, the fish spreads its "wings", which are semi-transparent, with a phosphorescent bright blue coloration at their tips. The fish also has large eyes.

The fish's main diet consists of small fish, bivalves, and crustaceans.

References

External links

 

flying gurnard
Fish of the Atlantic Ocean
flying gurnard
Fish of Cuba
Fish of the Dominican Republic
flying gurnard